José Roberto Chirino (born 2 September 1944) is an Argentine boxer. He competed in the men's light middleweight event at the 1964 Summer Olympics. At the 1964 Summer Olympics, he defeated John Elliott of Jamaica, before losing to Boris Lagutin of the Soviet Union.

References

1944 births
Living people
Argentine male boxers
Olympic boxers of Argentina
Boxers at the 1964 Summer Olympics
Place of birth missing (living people)
Light-middleweight boxers